Ryan Bevington (born 9 December 1988) is a Wales international rugby union player. A prop forward, he most recently played club rugby for the Dragons having previously played for Bristol, Bridgend and Ospreys.

In March 2018, Bevington was announced as signing for Dragons from the 2018–19 season.

International
In January 2011 he was named the Wales national rugby union team for the 2011 Six Nations Championship.

He made his full international debut for Wales versus the Barbarians on 4 June 2011.

References

External links
 Wales profile

Welsh rugby union players
Wales international rugby union players
Ospreys (rugby union) players
Bridgend RFC players
Dragons RFC players
Rugby union players from Bridgend
1988 births
Living people
Bristol Bears players
Rugby union props